Javaher Deh (also Romanized as Javāher Deh) is a village in Sakht Sar Rural District, in the Central District of Ramsar County, Mazandaran Province, Iran. At the 2006 census, its population was 170, in 76 families.

The villagers are engaged in animal husbandry, agriculture and horticulture, and its handicrafts include felt-making, pottery, blacksmithing and coppersmithing. The only communication route of the jewel leads to Ramsar and is also connected to Qazvin through the mountains.

Today, the drinking water of the region is supplied from several springs such as "Suleiman", "Barshi" and "Kuh-e Kane".

References 

Populated places in Ramsar County